Adolf Robert Zander (18 September 1895 – 27 June 1966) was a Swedish footballer who played as a goalkeeper.

Club career 
Zander is best remembered for representing Örgryte IS, which he helped win the 1925–26 Allsvenskan. He played in 57 games for the team between 1924 and 1927. He also represented IFK Göteborg and Redbergslids IK during his career.

International career 
A Swedish international between 1918 and 1926, Zander represented the Sweden national team at the 1920 and 1924 Summer Olympics. He won a total of 20 caps for the Sweden national team and was named Stor Grabb in 1926.

Personal life 
Zander is the great-grandfather of the current professional footballer Gustav Ludwigson who played for Örgryte IS in 2018 and 2019.

Career statistics

International

Honours 
Örgryte IS

 Allsvenskan: 1925–26
International
 Summer Olympics bronze: 1924
Individual
 Stor Grabb: 1926

References

External links
 

1895 births
1966 deaths
Swedish footballers
Sweden international footballers
Olympic footballers of Sweden
Footballers at the 1920 Summer Olympics
People from Luleå
Association football goalkeepers
Sportspeople from Norrbotten County